Menarche is the first menstrual cycle, or first menstrual bleeding, in female humans. From both social and medical perspectives, it is often considered the central event of female puberty, as it signals the possibility of fertility.

Girls experience menarche at different ages. Having menarche occur between the ages of 9–16 in the west is considered normal. Canadian psychological researcher Niva Piran claims that menarche or the perceived average age of puberty is used in many cultures to separate girls from activity with boys, and to begin transition into womanhood.

The timing of menarche is influenced by female biology, as well as genetic and environmental factors, especially nutritional factors. The mean age of menarche has declined over the last century, but the magnitude of the decline and the factors responsible remain subjects of contention. The worldwide average age of menarche is very difficult to estimate accurately, and it varies significantly by geographical region, race, ethnicity and other characteristics, and occurs mostly during a span of ages from 8 to 16, with a small percentage of girls having menarche by age 10, and the vast majority having it by the time they were 14.
There is a later age of onset in Asian populations compared to the West, but it too is changing with time. For example a Korean study in 2011 showed an overall average age of 12.7, with around 20% before age 12, and more than 90% by age 14. A Chinese study from 2014 published in Acta Paediatrica showed similar results (overall average of age 12.8 in 2005 down to age 12.3 in 2014) and a similar trend in time, but also similar findings about ethnic, cultural, and environmental effects.

The average age of menarche was about 12.7 years in Canada at 2001. and 12.9 in the United Kingdom. A study of girls in Istanbul, Turkey, in 2011 found the  median age at menarche to be 12.7 years. In the United States, an analysis of 10,590 women aged 15–44 taken from the 2013–2017 round of the CDC’s National Survey of Family Growth 
found a median age of 11.9 years (down from 12.1 in 1995), with a mean of 12.5 years (down from 12.6).

Physiology

Puberty
Menarche is the culmination of a series of physiological and anatomic processes of puberty:
 Attainment of a sufficient body mass (typically 17% body fat).
 Disinhibition  of the GnRH pulse generator in the arcuate nucleus of the hypothalamus.
 Secretion of estrogen by the ovaries in response to pituitary hormones.
 Over an interval of about 2 to 3 years, estrogen stimulates growth of the uterus (as well as height growth, breast growth, widening of the pelvis, and increased regional adipose tissue).
 Estrogen stimulates growth and vascularity of the endometrium, the lining of the uterus.
 Fluctuations of hormone levels can result in changes of adequacy of blood supply to parts of the endometrium.
 Death of some of the endometrial tissue from these hormone or blood supply fluctuations leads to deciduation, a sloughing of part of the lining with some blood flow from the vagina.

No specific hormonal signal for menarche is known; menarche as a discrete event is thought to be the relatively chance result of the gradual thickening of the endometrium induced by rising but fluctuating pubertal estrogen.

The menstruum, or flow, consists of a combination of fresh and clotted blood with endometrial tissue. The initial flow of menarche is usually brighter than mature menstrual flow. It is often scanty in amount and may be very brief, even a single instance of "spotting". Like other menses, menarche may be accompanied by abdominal cramping.

Relation to fertility
In most girls, menarche does not mean that ovulation has occurred. In postmenarchal girls, about 80% of the cycles were anovulatory in the first year after menarche, 50% in the third and 10% in the sixth year. Regular ovulation is usually indicated by predictable and consistent intervals between menses, predictable and consistent durations of menses, and predictable and consistent patterns of flow (e.g., heaviness or cramping). Continuing ovulation typically requires a body fat content of at least 22%. An anthropological term for this state of potential fertility is nubility.

On the other hand, not every girl follows the typical pattern, and some girls ovulate before the first menstruation. Although unlikely, it is possible for a girl who has engaged in sexual intercourse shortly before her menarche to conceive and become pregnant, which would delay her menarche until after the end of the pregnancy. This goes against the widely held assumption that a woman cannot become pregnant until after menarche. A young age at menarche is not correlated with a young age at first sexual intercourse.

Onset
When menarche occurs, it confirms that the girl has had a gradual estrogen-induced growth of the uterus, especially the endometrium, and that the "outflow tract" from the uterus, through the cervix to the vagina, is open.

When a woman experiences menarche, the blood flow can vary from a slow and spotty discharge to a consistent blood flow for 3-7 days. While the color of the blood does range from a brown to bright red color, this is normal; some women have light periods while others have heavy ones; no two women will have an identical experience.

In very rare instances, menarche may occur at an unusually early age, preceding thelarche and other signs of puberty. This is termed isolated premature menarche, but other causes of vaginal bleeding must be investigated and excluded. Growth is usually normal. Isolated premature menarche is rarely the first manifestation of precocious puberty.

When menarche has failed to occur for more than three years after thelarche, or beyond 16 years of age, the delay is referred to as primary amenorrhea.

Timing

Chronic illness
Certain systemic or chronic illness can delay menarche, such as undiagnosed and untreated celiac disease (which often occurs without gastrointestinal symptoms), asthma, diabetes mellitus type 1, cystic fibrosis and inflammatory diseases, among others. In some cases, because biochemical tests are not always discriminatory, underlying pathologies are not identified and the girl is classified as constitutional growth delay. Short stature, delayed growth in height and weight, and/or delayed menarche may be the only clinical manifestations of celiac disease, in absence of any other symptoms. According to a review article, there may also be an association between early age at menarche and breast cancer risk.

Conditions and disease states 
Studies have been conducted to observe the association of the timing of menarche with various conditions and diseases. Some studies have shown that there may be an association between early or late-age menarche and cardiovascular disease, although the mechanism of the association is not well understood. A systematic review has concluded that early age at menarche is also a risk factor for the insulin resistance condition. There is conflicting evidence regarding the association between obesity and timing of menarche; a meta-analysis and systematic review has determined that more studies must be conducted to make any definitive conclusions about this association.

Effects of stress and social environment
Some of the aspects of family structure and function reported to be independently associated with earlier menarche [antenatal and early childhood]
 Being non-white (in the UK)
 Having experienced pre-eclampsia in the womb
 Being a singleton, i.e. not a twin, triplet, etc.
 Low birthweight
 Not having been breast-fed
 Previous exposure to smoking
 High-conflict family relationships
 Increased incidence of childhood obesity.
 Lack of exercise in childhood

Other research has focused on the effect of childhood stress on timing of puberty, especially female. Stress is a vague term and studies have examined conditions ranging from family tensions or conflict to wartime refugee status with threat to physical survival. The more dire social conditions have been found to be associated with delay of maturation, an effect that may be compounded by dietary inadequacy. There is more uncertainty and mixed evidence as to whether milder degrees of stress or early-life under-nutrition can accelerate puberty in girls as would be predicted by life history theory and demonstrated in many other mammals.

The understanding of these environmental effects is incomplete and the following observations and cautions are relevant:
 Mechanisms of these social effects are unknown, though a variety of physiological processes, including pheromones, have been suggested based on animal research.
 Most of these "effects" are statistical associations revealed by epidemiologic surveys. Statistical associations are not necessarily causal, and a variety of secondary variables and alternative explanations can be possibly intervening. Effects of such small size can never be confirmed or refuted for any individual child.
 Despite the small magnitude of effect, interpretations of the data are politically controversial because of the ease with which this type of research can be used for political advocacy. Accusations of bias based on political agenda sometimes accompany scientific criticism.
 Correlation does not imply causation. While correlation can be objectively measured, causation is statistically inferred. Some suggest that childhood stress is caused by precocious puberty recognized later, rather than being the cause of it.

Changes in time of average age

There were few systematic studies of timing of menarche before the later half of the 20th century. Most older estimates of average timing of menarche were based on observation of a small homogeneous population not necessarily representative of the larger population, or based on recall by adult women, which is also susceptible to various forms of error. Most sources agree that the average age of menarche in girls in modern societies has declined, though the reasons and the degree remain subjects of controversy. From the sixth to the fifteenth centuries in Europe, most women reached menarche on average at about 14, between the ages of 12 and 15.  A large North American survey reported only a 2–3 month decline from the mid-1970s to the mid-1990s. A 2011 study found that each 1 kg/m2 increase in childhood body-mass index (BMI) can be expected to result in a 6.5% higher absolute risk of early menarche (before age 12 years).

Fewer than 10% of U.S. girls start to menstruate before 11 years of age, and 90% of all U.S. girls are menstruating by 13.8 years of age, with a median age of 12.4 years. This age at menarche is not much different (0.3 years earlier) than that reported for U.S. girls in 1973. Age at menarche for non-Hispanic black girls was significantly earlier than that of white girls at 10%, 25%, and 50% of those who had attained menarche, whereas non-white Mexican American girls were only slightly earlier than the white girls at 25%.

Culture

Menstruation is a cultural as well as scientific phenomenon as many societies have specific rituals and cultural norms associated with it. These rituals typically begin at menarche and some are enacted during each menstruation cycle. The rituals are important in determining a status change for girls. Upon menarche and completion of the ritual, they have become a woman as defined by their culture.

For young women in many cultures, the first menstruation is a marker that signifies a change in status. Post-menarche, the young woman enters a stage called maidenhood, the stage between menarche and marriage. There are cultures that have in past centuries, and in present, practiced rites of passage for a girl experiencing menarche.

Celebratory ceremonies

In some cultures, a party, or celebration is thrown to show the girl's transition to womanhood. This party is similar to the quinceañera in Latin America, except that a specific age marks the transition rather than menarche. In Morocco, the girl is thrown a celebration. All of her family members are invited and the girl is showered with money and gifts.

When a Japanese girl had her first period, the family sometimes celebrated by eating red-colored rice and beans (sekihan). The color of blood and the red of sekihan are not related. All the rice of ancient times of Japan was red. Since rice was precious in ancient Japan (usually, millet was eaten), it was eaten only during the celebration. Sekihan was the tradition of an ancient custom. The celebration was kept a secret from extended family until the rice was served.

In some Indian communities, young women are given a special menarche ceremony called Ruthu Sadangu.

The Mescalero Apaches place high importance on their menarche ceremony and it is regarded as the most important ritual in their tribe. Each year, there is an eight-day event celebrating all of the girls who have menstruated in the past year. The days are split between feasting and private ceremonies reflecting on their new womanly status.

Rituals of learning
In Australia, the Aborigines treat a girl to "love magic". She is taught the ways of womanhood by the other women in her tribe. Her mother builds her a menstruation hut to which she confines herself for the remainder of her menses. The hut is burned and she is bathed in the river at the end of menstruation. When she returns to the village, she is paired with a man who will be her husband.

In the United States, some public schools have a sex education program that teaches girls about menstruation and what to expect at the onset of menarche (often this takes place during the fourth grade). Historically menstruation has been a social taboo and girls were taught about menarche and menstruation by their mothers or a female role model. Then, and to an extent now, menstruation was a private matter and a girl's menarche was not a community phenomenon.

Rituals of cleansing or purification
The Ulithi tribe of Micronesia call a girl's menarche kufar. She goes to a menstrual house, where the women bathe her and recite spells. She will have to return to the menstruation hut every time she menstruates. Her parents build her a private hut that she will live in until she is married.

In Sri Lanka, an astrologer is contacted to study the alignment of stars when the girl experiences menarche because it is believed that her future can be predicted. The women of the family then gather in her home and scrub her in a ritual bathing ceremony. Her family then throws a familial party at which the girl wears white and may receive gifts.

In Ethiopia, Beta Jewish women were separated from male society and sent to menstruation huts during menarche and every menstruation following as the blood associated with menstruation in the Beta Jewish culture was believed to be impure. The Beta Jews built their villages surrounding and near bodies of water specifically for their women to have a place to clean themselves. The menstruation huts were built close to these bodies of water.

Rituals of transformation and scarification
In Nigeria, the Tiv ethnic group cut four lines into the abdomen of their girls during menarche. The lines are supposed to represent fertility.

Rituals of strength
The Navajo have a celebration called kinaalda (kinn-all-duh). Girls are expected to demonstrate their strength through footraces. The girls make a cornmeal pudding for the tribe to taste. The girls who experience menarche wear special clothes and style their hair like the Navajo goddess "Changing Woman".

The Nuu-chah-nulth (also known as the Nootka) believe that physical endurance is the most important quality in young women. At menarche the girl is taken out to sea and left there to swim back.

Movies and TV
In the horror movie Carrie (1976), an adaptation of the Stephen King novel of the same name, protagonist Carrie White experiences her first period as she showers after the school gym class. Unaware of what is happening to her, she panics and pleads for help, but the other girls respond by bullying her. Carrie's first period unleashes her violent powers and is central to her dangerous and out of control transformation. This theme is common to horror movies, another notable example being the Canadian horror movie Ginger Snaps (2000), where the protagonist's first period is central to her gradual transformation into a werewolf. The theme of transformation around the menarche is similarly present in Turning Red (2022), although the film also explores other aspects of puberty as a whole and the protagonist does not actually start her first period. Girls experiencing their first period is part of many movies, particularly ones that include coming-of-age plot lines, such as The Blue Lagoon (1980), The Company of Wolves (1984), An Angel at My Table (1990), My Girl (1991), Return to the Blue Lagoon (1991), Eve’s Bayou (1997), and A Walk on the Moon (1999). Menarche is also discussed in an episode of the animated series Baymax! (2022) in which the eponymous healthcare robot helps a girl deal with her first period.

See also 
 Adrenarche
 Delayed puberty
 Gonadarche
 Lina Medina, who had her menarche at age 8 months and is the youngest mother in history
 Menopause, the equivalent opposite change at the end of the child-bearing years
 Pubarche
 Spermarche
 Thelarche

References

Further reading

External links 
 For mothers supporting their daughters as they come of age
 Discusses some of the social influences

Developmental biology
Developmental stages
Menstrual cycle
Pediatrics
Puberty
Sexuality and age
Human female endocrine system

ja:月経#初潮